The Union Street Historic District is a historic district on Union Street between Langley Road and Herrick Road, and at 17–31 Herrick Road in Newton, Massachusetts. It encompasses the city's only significant cluster of 19th century commercial buildings. It was added to the National Register of Historic Places in 1986.

Development in the Newton Centre area did not begin until the arrival of the railroad in the late 1880s, and the construction in 1890 of the railroad station that served the village. The district includes five buildings: three commercial buildings that line the north side of Union Street, the railroad station, and an apartment block on Herrick Street.

The Newton Centre Station (no longer formally affiliated with the railroad line, which now serves the MBTA Green Line D branch) was designed by H. H. Richardson and completed after his death by his successor firm, Shepley, Rutan and Coolidge. It has typical Richardsonian Romanesque styling, with brownstone and granite construction, and an overhanging slate roof with arched eyebrow dormer windows. The station and an adjacent freight and baggage house were listed on the National Register as part of a district of surviving Richardson railroad stations in Newton; the freight building was mostly demolished in 1985, with parts of the original building being incorporated into new construction on the site, and original landscaping by the Olmsted Brothers also does not survive.

The Bray building at 93–105 is the other major building on Union Street. This 2-1/2 story Classical Revival building is built out of buff-colored brick, with a copper-clad hip roof, and a modillioned cornice. Arched windows in the attic are also lined with copper. It was built in 1893 for Mellen Bray, who also built the apartment block at 17–31 Herrick Street.

The Union building at 65–73 Union Street was built in 1896. Georgian Revival in style, it has seven bays with storefronts on the ground level, and an entranceway recessed behind an arch flanked by brick pilasters. It also has a modillioned cornice, with dentil moulding.

See also
 National Register of Historic Places listings in Newton, Massachusetts

References

National Register of Historic Places in Newton, Massachusetts
Historic districts in Middlesex County, Massachusetts
Colonial Revival architecture in Massachusetts
Neoclassical architecture in Massachusetts
Newton, Massachusetts
Historic districts on the National Register of Historic Places in Massachusetts